"Ma Baker" is a song by disco group Boney M., released as a single in 1977. It was the first single off their second album Love for Sale and their third consecutive chart-topper in Germany.

The song was a huge success in Europe and Latin America, topping the charts in many countries there. It was a number 2 hit in the UK (only surpassed by Donna Summer's "I Feel Love"). In the U.S, the song only reached number 96.

The song
Frank Farian's assistant Hans-Jörg Mayer discovered a popular Tunisian folkloric song, "Sidi Mansour" while on holiday, and rewrote the song into a disco track. The lyrics by Fred Jay were inspired by the story of legendary 1930s US outlaw Ma Barker, although the name was changed into "Ma Baker" because "it sounded better".

With a structure similar to Boney M.'s breakthrough single "Daddy Cool", using the same gimmick percussion, alternating answer-back vocals, and a spoken mid-part, the song opened with a snarling "Freeze, I'm Ma Baker, put your hands in the air and gimme all your money". Although it has never been officially credited, the voice was that of Linda Blake, the wife of Frank Farian's American friend Bill Swisher, who was a soldier in Germany at the time. Bill Swisher performed the spoken mid-part, announcing a bulletin from the FBI. He was used on several later Boney M. recordings, including "Rasputin" and "El Lute".

Farian re-recorded the song with Milli Vanilli in 1988, and reused both spoken voiceovers from the original song in the cover. Boney M.'s version was remixed the same year, 1993 and again in 1998. The song has been covered a number of times, including Banda R-15 and Knorkator. The "ma ma ma ma" chorus vocals were also sampled in Lady Gaga's "Poker Face".

Charts

Weekly charts

Year-end charts

Sales and certifications

1993 remix

Following the remix of "Brown Girl in the Ring", Farian remixed "Ma Baker" in 1993. While a modest club hit, it failed to enter the European charts. "Borsalino" and "The Most Wanted Woman" are two dub mixes of the track. The new remix was included in the compilation album More Gold - 20 Super Hits Vol. II.

Germany

12"
"Ma Baker (Remix '93)" (BMG 74321 15940 1, 1993)
Side A – Gangster
"Ma Baker (Remix '93)" (Bonnie & Clyde mix) – 5:25
"The Most Wanted Woman" – 3:30
Side B – Fashion
"Borsalino (Trainee Mix)" – 4:55
"Ma Baker (Remix '93)" (Radio Edit) – 3:58

CD
"Ma Baker (Remix '93)" (BMG 74321 15940 2, 1993)
"Ma Baker (Remix '93)" (Radio Edit) – 3:58
"Ma Baker (Remix '93)" (Bonnie & Clyde mix) – 5:25
"Borsalino (Trainee Mix)" – 4:55
"The Most Wanted Woman" – 3:30

1998 remix

In 1998, a new remix of "Ma Baker" by Sash! started to chart as a 12" single. Just as the CD-single was about to follow, it was withdrawn, and a new version appeared, re-titled "Somebody Scream! Ma Baker" featuring Horny United. The single was a Top 30 hit in Germany, Netherlands, Belgium, Switzerland, and even peaked at no. 6 (two weeks) in Finland and no. 10 in Sweden. When released in the UK in April, it peaked at no. 22. The accompanying video featured a young woman, kickboxing, training with a gun, the only relation to the original group being her watching the original 1977 video of "Ma Baker" on a TV set.

EU

12"
Boney M. / Horny United Feat. Boney M. - "Ma Baker" / "Somebody Scream - Ma Baker" (2 x 12", Logic Records/Lautstark/BMG 74321 64561 1, 1999)
Side A
Boney M. "Ma Baker" (Extended Vocal Edit) – 5:26
Side B
Boney M. "Ma Baker" (Disco Dub Edit) – 5:35
Side C
Horny United "Somebody Scream" (Massive Mix) – 7:30
Horny United "Somebody Scream" (Screamless Mix) – 6:16
Side D
Horny United "Somebody Scream - Ma Baker" (Full Vocal Mix)
Horny United "Somebody Scream - Ma Baker" (Ma Baker House Mix)

CD
Boney M vs. Sash!: "Ma Baker" (BMG 74321 63942 2, 1998)
"Ma Baker" (Tokapi Radio Edit) – 3:24
"Ma Baker" (Original Edit) – 3:35
"Ma Baker" (Extended Vocal Edit) – 5:26
"Ma Baker" (Disco Dub Edit) – 5:35

Boney M. vs. Sash!/Horny United Featuring Boney M.: "Ma Baker"/"Somebody Scream" (BMG 74321 64561 2, 1999)
Boney M. vs. Sash! "Ma Baker" (Extended Radio Edit) – 4:54
Boney M. vs. Sash! "Ma Baker" (Disco Dub Edit) (5:32)
Horny United Featuring Boney M. "Somebody Scream (Ma Baker)" (Radio Edit) (Oliver Wallner, Re-Run) – 4:17
Horny United Featuring Boney M. "Somebody Scream (Ma Baker)" (Massive Mix) (Oliver Wallner, Re-Run) – 6:59

UK

12"
Boney M. vs. Horny United "Ma Baker/Somebody Scream" (Logic Records 74321 65387 1, 1999)
Side A
"Ma Baker" (Club Mix by Horny United)
Side B
"Somebody Scream" (Beatroute Star Bar Mix by DJ Slammer & Mark Bambach)
"Somebody Scream" (Cosmic People Mix)

CD
Boney M. vs. Horny United "Ma Baker/Somebody Scream" (Logic Records 74321 65387 2, 1999)
"Ma Baker/Somebody Scream" (Radio Edit) – 3:06
"Ma Baker" (Sash! Radio Edit) – 3:27
"Somebody Scream" (Massive Club mix) – 7:31
"Ma Baker" (Sash! 12" Mix) – 4:55

Charts

See also
List of Dutch Top 40 number-one singles of 1977
List of European number-one hits of 1977
List of number-one singles of 1977 (France)
List of number-one hits of 1977 (Germany)
List of number-one hits of 1977 (Mexico)
List of number-one singles of 1977 (Spain)
List of number-one singles and albums in Sweden
List of number-one singles from 1968 to 1979 (Switzerland)
VG-lista 1964 to 1994

References

1977 singles
1977 songs
Atco Records singles
Atlantic Records singles
Boney M. songs
Dutch Top 40 number-one singles
European Hot 100 Singles number-one singles
Great Depression songs
Hansa Records singles
Number-one singles in Austria
Number-one singles in France
Number-one singles in Germany
Number-one singles in Spain
Number-one singles in Sweden
Number-one singles in Switzerland
Number-one singles in Norway
Song recordings produced by Frank Farian
Ultratop 50 Singles (Flanders) number-one singles
Songs about criminals
Songs about Chicago
Cultural depictions of Ma Barker
Songs about mothers